The Burro da Ilha Graciosa or Burro Anão da Graciosa is a breed of small domestic donkey endemic to the island of Graciosa, in the North Atlantic archipelago of the Azores, which are an autonomous region of Portugal. It is critically endangered, but is not officially recognised or reported to the DAD-IS database of the FAO. Efforts are being made to obtain official recognition and protection of the breed.

History

Donkeys were introduced to the Azores, which does not have any large indigenous mammal, by Portuguese colonists in the fifteenth century; their presence there is documented in the Saudades da Terra of Gaspar Frutuoso (1522–1591). The donkey became the principal beast of burden in the Azores. It was used also for riding, but not as a draught animal. Donkeys were very numerous in the islands; in 1841 the number on São Miguel alone was estimated at 8000.

The number of donkeys on Graciosa in now severely reduced; the number remaining was reported as 26 in 2001 and as about 70 in 2008. As with the Miranda donkey, male donkeys used for farm work were for preference castrated; the number of donkey geldings on the island may be a factor in the effective population.

A process of recognition of the Burro da Ilha Graciosa as an autochthonous breed began in 2005. An association, the Associação de Criadores e Amigos do Burro da Ilha Graciosa, was formed in 2013.

Characteristics

The Burro da Ilha Graciosa is a small donkey, standing on average . The coat is usually pale grey or mouse-brown in colour, but may also be bay or black; the belly, muzzle and surround of the eyes are paler. A darker dorsal stripe and shoulder-stripe are often seen, especially in pale-coloured animals; the legs may have zebra-stripes.

References 

Donkey breeds originating in Portugal
Donkey breeds
Graciosa Island (Azores)
Fauna of the Azores